The two-tree broadcast (abbreviated 2tree-broadcast or 23-broadcast) is an algorithm that implements a broadcast communication pattern on a distributed system using message passing.
A broadcast is a commonly used collective operation that sends data from one processor to all other processors.
The two-tree broadcast communicates concurrently over two binary trees that span all processors. This achieves full usage of the bandwidth in the full-duplex communication model while having a startup latency logarithmic in the number of partaking processors.
The algorithm can also be adapted to perform a reduction or prefix sum.

Algorithm 
A broadcast sends a message from a specified root processor to all other processors.
Binary tree broadcasting uses a binary tree to model the communication between the processors.
Each processor corresponds to one node in the tree, and the root processor is the root of the tree.
To broadcast a message , the root sends  to its two children (child nodes). Each processor waits until it receives  and then sends  to its children. Because leaves have no children, they don't have to send any messages.
The broadcasting process can be pipelined by splitting the message into  blocks, which are then broadcast consecutively.
In such a binary tree, the leaves of the tree only receive data, but never send any data themselves. If the communication is bidirectional (full-duplex), meaning each processor can send a message and receive a message at the same time, the leaves only use one half of the available bandwidth.

The trees are constructed so that the interior nodes of one tree correspond to leaf nodes of the other tree.
The data that has to be broadcast is split into blocks of equal size.
In each step of the algorithm, each processor receives one block and sends the previous block to one of its children in the tree in which it is an interior node.
A schedule is needed so that no processor has to send or receive two messages in the same step.
To create such a schedule, the edges of both trees are colored with 0 and 1 such that
Edges with color 0 are used in even steps, edges with color 1 are used in odd steps.
This schedule allows each processor to send one message and receive one message in each step, fully utilizing the available bandwidth.
Assume that processor  wants to broadcast a message. The two trees are constructed for the remaining processors. Processor  sends blocks alternating to the roots of the two trees, so each tree broadcasts one half of the message.

Analysis 

Construction of the trees 

Let .
 and  can be constructed as trees of height , such that both trees form an in-order numbering of the processors, with the following method:
: If ,  is a complete binary tree of height  except that the rightmost leaf is missing. Otherwise,  consists of a complete binary tree of height   covering PEs , a recursively constructed tree covering PEs , and a root at PE  whose children are the roots of the left and the right subtree.
: There are two ways to construct .
With shifting,  is first constructed like , except that it contains an additional processor. Then  is shifted by one position to the left and the leftmost leaf is removed.
Mirroring only works for even .

It can be proven that a coloring with the desired properties exists for all .
When mirroring is used to construct , each processor can independently compute the color of its incident edges in  time.

Communication Time 

Suppose the message of size  is split into  blocks. Each communication step takes time .
Let  be the height of the communication structure with the root at processor  and the two trees below it. 
After  steps, the first data block has reached every node in both trees. Afterwards, each processor receives one block in every step until it received all blocks.

Comparison to similar algorithms 
In a linear pipeline broadcast, the message is split into  blocks. In each step, each processor  receives one block from the processor  and sends one block to the processor .
For large , the  startup latency of the two-tree broadcast is faster.
Because both algorithms have optimal throughput, the two-tree algorithm is faster for a large numbers of processors.

A binomial tree broadcast communicates along a binomial tree. Each process receives the message that is broadcast (the root already has the message) and then sends the message to its children.
A binomial tree broadcast has only half the startup time of the two-tree broadcast, but a factor of  more communication.
The binomial tree broadcast is faster than the two-tree broadcast for small messages, but slower for large messages.

 
A pipelined binary tree broadcast splits the message into  blocks and broadcasts the blocks consecutively over a binary tree.

The pipelined Fibonacci tree broadcast has half the startup latency of the two-tree broadcast, but also only half of the throughput.
It is faster for small messages, while the two-tree broadcast is faster for large messages.

Usage for other communication primitives

Reduction 

A reduction (MPI_Reduce in the MPI standard) computes  where  is a vector of length  originally
The result is stored at a specified root processor .

In this case the communication is identical to the broadcast, except that the communication direction is reversed.
Each process receives two blocks from its children, reduces them with its own block, and sends the result to its parent.
If the reduce operation is commutative, the result can be achieved for any root by renumbering the processors.

In this case, the remaining processors are split into two subgroups. The processors  perform a reduction to the root  and the processors  perform a reduction to the root . Processor  receives blocks alternating from the two roots of the subgroups.

Prefix sum 
A prefix sum (MPI_Scan) computes  for each
processor   where  is a vector of length  originally
The communication in the up-phase is equivalent to a reduction to processor  and the communication in the down-phase is equivalent to a broadcast from the processor .
The total communication time is about twice the communication time of the two-tree broadcast.

ESBT broadcast 
If  is a power of two, there is an optimal broadcasting algorithm based on edge disjoint spanning binomial trees (ESBT) in a hypercube.
The hypercube, excluding the root , is split into  ESBTs.
The algorithm uses pipelining by splitting the broadcast data into  blocks.
Processor  cyclically distributes blocks to the roots of the ESBTs and each ESBT performs a pipelined binary tree broadcast.
In step , each processor sends and receives one message along dimension .

References 

Networking algorithms
Distributed algorithms